The abaQulusi or Qulusi are a zulu tribe from South Africa. They are based in the abaqulusi district, Kwazulu-Natal, that bears their name.

History

Origins 
The aunt of King Shaka, Mkabayi kaJama, created the tribe. When the king sent Mkabayi to ebaQuluseni, near the present Vryheid and Hlobane, she founded the powerful abaQulusi tribe that played a big role in the coming wars.

Conflicts where the abaQulusi were involved 
During the Battle of Hlobane and the Battle of Kambula of the Anglo-Zulu war of 1879, the abaQulusi were commanded by the iNkosi Msebe kaMadaka. During the Battle of Holkrans against the Boers in 1902, the iNkosi Sikhobobho was in command.

Further reading 
 Donald R. Morris, The washing of the spears : a history of the rise of the Zulu nation under Shaka and its fall in the Zulu War of 1879, Simon & Schuster, New York, 1971, 1965, 655 p. 
 William Watson Race, The Epic Anglo Zulu War on Canvas, Talisman Prints, 2007, .
 Adrian Greaves, Xolani Mkhize, The Tribe that Washed its Spears: The Zulu's at War, Pen and sword military, 2013, .
 Nicki von der Heyde, Field Guide to the Battlefields of South Africa, Struik, 2013,

Novels 
 David Ebsworth, The Kraals of Ulundi, Silverwood Books, 2014
 Philippe Morvan, Les fils du ciel (The sons of the sky), Calmann-Lévy, 2021

References 

Zulu topics
Ethnic groups in South Africa
Zulu history